The Gerlach Water Tower, on Main St. in Gerlach, Nevada, was built in 1909 by the Utah Construction Co.

It has a 44,000 gallon capacity redwood tank.  It served locomotives of the Western Pacific Railroad Company and also the company town of Gerlach.
It was listed on the National Register of Historic Places in 1981.

References

External links 

National Register of Historic Places in Washoe County, Nevada
Buildings and structures completed in 1909
Buildings and structures on the National Register of Historic Places in Nevada
Water towers on the National Register of Historic Places